Grič pri Dobličah is a settlement southwest of Dobliče in the Municipality of Črnomelj in the White Carniola area of southeastern Slovenia. The area is part of the traditional region of Lower Carniola and is now included in the Southeast Slovenia Statistical Region. Hamlets of the village includes Dolnji Grič, which comprises the village core, and Gornji Grič, as well as Vidoše (in older sources Vidoši) and Kralji. Vidoše has only a few houses along the road from Bistrica to Mavrlen. Vidoše was formerly a hamlet of Doblička Gora.

Geography
The village lies below the northeast slope of Mount Poljane. There are several caves in the hills above the village. Grdan Cave lies to the west (Grdan is an old surname in the area and skedenj is a common noun referring to a small, horizontal karst cave). Zjot (or Zjod) Cave lies above the hamlet of Vidoše (the cave's name comes from the ground being eroded by water; cf. izjeda 'a hollow carved by water').

Name
The name of the settlement was changed from Grič to Grič pri Dobličah (literally, 'Grič near Dobliče') in 1955.

References

External links
Grič pri Dobličah on Geopedia

Populated places in the Municipality of Črnomelj